David Maher is a computer scientist and the chief technology officer and executive vice president of Intertrust Technologies. He is also a Bell Labs Fellow and was chief architect for AT&T's STU-III secure voice, data and video products used by the White House and the United States Department of Defense.

Life 
David Maher joined Intertrust Technologies in 1999 as the chief technology officer. Prior to joining Intertrust, Maher worked at AT&T where he held several positions including Head of Secure Systems Research Department. Maher holds a Ph.D. in mathematics from Lehigh University.

Prior to joining Intertrust, Maher was the chief scientist for AT&T Secure Communications Systems. While at AT&T, he was the security architect for AT&T's Internet services platform as well as the chief architect for the STU-III secure voice, data and video products which have been used by the White House and the Department of Defense. Maher joined Bell Labs in 1981 and was recognized as a Bell Labs Fellow for his work there.

Maher has also taught electrical engineering, mathematics, and computer science at several institutions.

References

Year of birth missing (living people)
Living people
American chief technology officers
American computer scientists
Scientists at Bell Labs
Lehigh University alumni
Place of birth missing (living people)